The Dahlonega Mint was a former branch of the United States Mint built during the Georgia Gold Rush to help the miners get their gold assayed and minted, without having to travel to the Philadelphia Mint.  It was located at (34°31.8′N 83°59.2′W ) in Dahlonega, Lumpkin County, Georgia. Coins produced at the Dahlonega Mint bear the "D" mint mark. That mint mark is used today by the Denver Mint, which opened in 1897, over three decades after the Dahlonega Mint closed. All coins from the Dahlonega Mint are gold, in the $1, $2.50, $3, and $5 denominations, and bear dates in the range 1838–1861.

Creation
The Mint Act of 1835, established by the United States Congress on 3 March, established "one branch at the city of New Orleans for the coinage of gold and silver; one branch at the town of Charlotte...for the coinage of gold only; and one branch at or near Dahlonega, in Lumpkin County, in the state of Georgia, also for the coinage of gold only."

Ignatius Alphonso Few, appointed commissioner, bought ten acres south of Dahlonega for $1,050 (equal to $ today) in August 1835, and hired the architect Benjamin Towns, the lowest bidder at $33,450 (equal to $ today), to construct the mint within eighteen months.  Mint machinery was installed in 1837, which included "cutting presses, a fly wheel, a drawing frame, a crank shaft, a coining press, and eighteen annealing pans."  The coining press could make "fifty to sixty gold coins per minute."

Superintendent Dr. Joseph Singleton, opened the mint in February 1838.  About a thousand ounces of gold were deposited in the first week, and the first coins consisting of eighty five-dollar gold pieces, were minted on 17 April.

Production

The mint produced coins every year from 1838 through 1861. Denominations produced included $1.00; $2.50 (quarter eagles); $3.00 (1854 only); and $5.00 (half eagles).

The Civil War
When the American Civil War broke out in 1861, the Dahlonega Mint was seized by the Confederates. It is believed that after the Confederates took over the mint in 1861, that some gold dollars and half eagles were minted under the authority of the Confederate States Government. The exact number of 1861-D gold dollars produced is unknown, while approximately 1,597 1861-D half eagles were struck.  Because of their relatively low mintage, all Dahlonega-minted gold coins are rare. It is generally accepted that gold coins estimated to exceed $6 million were minted here.

Post Civil War
After the end of the Civil War, The United States Government decided against reopening the mint. The building was unused until the founding of North Georgia College in 1873. The mint building was used as the main academic and administrative building for the college until a fire destroyed the original building in December 1878. A new building for the college was erected on the foundations of the old mint building. This building is now named Price Memorial Hall after William P. Price, the founder of the college, and is still used by the college today.

Gold leaf from this area also covers the exterior of the domed roof over the rotunda of the Georgia State Capitol in Atlanta. Local media often refer to the state legislature's activities as what's going on "under the gold dome". After the capitol building was gold leafed citizens of Dahlonega began a campaign to gold leaf Price Memorial Hall after the same fashion as the capitol.

For other United States Mint facilities, see Historical United States mints.

Superintendents
Six men acted as Superintendent of the Dahlonega Mint.
Joseph Singleton, 1838–1841
Paul Rossignol, 1841–1843
James Fairlie Cooper, 1843–1849
Anderson Redding, 1849–1853
Julius Patton, 1853–1860
George Kellogg, 1860–1861

See also

Historical United States mints
California gold coinage

References

Further reading
Georgia Historical Marker
Winter, Douglas "Gold Coins of the Dahlonega Mint" 1997.  DWN Publishing

External links

U.S. Mint
'Thar's Gold in Them Thar Hills': Gold and Gold Mining in Georgia, 1830s-1940s from the Digital Library of Georgia

1837 establishments in Georgia (U.S. state)
Georgia Gold Rush
United States Mint
Landmarks in Georgia (U.S. state)
Mints of the United States
Lumpkin County, Georgia